The 2004 Women's National Invitation Tournament was a single-elimination tournament of 32 NCAA Division I teams that were not selected to participate in the 2004 Women's NCAA tournament. It was the seventh edition of the postseason Women's National Invitation Tournament.

In one semifinal of the tournament, Creighton faced Richmond, played at Omaha Civic Auditorium. The other semifinal game featured UNLV against Iowa State. Creighton defeated Richmond 81–72 behind Dayna Finch's 24 points and a 16 point, 9 rebound and 8 assist performance by Christy Neneman, flirting with a triple double.  Meanwhile, UNLV defeated Iowa State 65–59. UNLV was down by double digits 47–37 midway through the second half, but overcame the deficit to take a lead with just under a minute remaining, then hitting five of six free throws in the final 32 seconds to win the game.

The final pitted Creighton and UNLV against each other in Omaha, Nebraska at the Omaha Civic Auditorium. Creighton dominated the title game from the very beginning, outscoring the Lady Rebels early to take a 17–4 lead. UNLV briefly cut the lead to single digits early in the second half but the Blue Jays went on a 10–2 run to retake a commanding lead. They later had a 13–0 run to put the game out of reach and gave the coach the opportunity to play all the bench players.

Bracket

Region 1
*Host • Source

Region 2
*Host • Source

Region 3
*Host • Source

Region 4
*Host • Source

Semifinals and championship game
Source

References

Women's National Invitation Tournament
Women's National Invitation Tournament
Women's National Invitation Tournament